Douw Aturure Airport  is an airport in Nabire, Nabire Regency, Central Papua, Indonesia. The airport is just a few hundred meters away from the city center.

History
On 23 April 2019, a building in the airport caught on fire. There were no casualties, and the operations of the airport following the fire were unaffected.

Airlines and destinations

The following destinations are served from Douw Aturure Airport:

Gallery

References

External links 
Nabire Airport - Indonesia Airport global website

Airports in Central Papua